Ravn Alaska operated scheduled passenger service to the following destinations:

References

Lists of airline destinations
Ravn Alaska destinations